The Breda CC.20 was an Italian heavy bomber prototype of 1929 designed and built by the Breda company.

Design and development
Ing Arturo Crocco and Ing Julio Constance designed the CC.20 -- "CC" for the surnames of the two engineers—which was Bredas first monoplane bomber. The seven-seat trimotor mid-wing monoplane CC.20 was powered by three  Isotta Fraschini Asso 500 engines and had a powerful defensive armament of one  cannon and seven  machine guns.

The CC.20 prototype first flew in 1929 and test flights showed it to be very slow with a short range; Breda abandoned the project.

Operators

Specifications

1920s Italian bomber aircraft
CC.020
Trimotors
Mid-wing aircraft
Aircraft first flown in 1929